Manduca is a genus of moths in the family Sphingidae, the hawkmoths. The genus is used as a model in the biological sciences. The tobacco hornworm (Manduca sexta) and the tomato hornworm (M. quinquemaculata) in particular have been well studied. The genus was erected by Jacob Hübner in 1807.

Species

References

 
Sphingidae of South America
Moth genera
Taxa named by Jacob Hübner